Stony Hill may refer to:

Stony Hill, a strategic elevation during the Battle of Gettysburg, second day
Stony Hill, Jamaica, a neighborhood on the outskirts of Kingston
Stony Hill, County Antrim, a townland in County Antrim, Northern Ireland
Stony Hill (album), by Damian Marley (2017)